LoveStuck is a 2017 Australian film directed by Murray Fahey.

Production
The film was shot in 2013 by leading improvisation actors.

References

External links
LoveStruck at IMDb
Review at the Australian
Review of film at Filmink

2017 films
Australian romantic comedy films
2010s Australian films